The 2021/22 NTFL season was the 101st season of the Northern Territory Football League (NTFL).

References 

Northern Territory Football League seasons
NTFL